Myoporum bontioides is a species of the flowering plant in the family Scrophulariaceae. It is a shrub growing in coastal areas of southern Japan and South China including beaches and estuaries where there are no large breaking waves.

Description
They have an obvious mid-vein on the lower surface and are slightly sticky when young.

There are 5 egg-shaped, green, glabrous, pointed sepals and 5 petals joined at their bases, forming a bell-shaped tube. The petals are white to pale pinkish, spotted with purple on the petal lobes and inside the tube. The outside of the tube is glabrous but the inside sometimes has a few hairs. There are 4 stamens which extend beyond the petal tube. Flowering occurs from April to June and is followed by purplish red, roughly spherical fruits,   in diameter, which turn pale brown as they dry.

Taxonomy and naming
Myoporum bontioides  was first formally described in 1846 by Philipp Franz von Siebold and Joseph Gerhard Zuccarini who gave it the name Pentacoelium bontioides in Abhandlungen der Mathematisch-Physikalischen Klasse der Königlich Bayerischen Akademie der Wissenschaften. In 1862, Asa Gray changed the name to Myoporum bontioides in the Proceedings of the American Academy of Arts and Sciences. The specific epithet (bontioides) refers to the similarity of this species to plants in the genus Bontia.

Distribution and habitat
Myoporum bontioides occurs in coastal areas of southern Japan, Taiwan, and South China including Hong Kong. It grows above the high tide line on beaches, around bays and along estuaries.

References

bontioides
Scrophulariaceae
Flora of China
Flora of Japan
Flora of Taiwan
Taxa named by Joseph Gerhard Zuccarini
Plants described in 1846